Workin' Out! is an album by American jazz pianist Bobby Timmons recorded in 1964 and released in 1965 on the Prestige label.

Reception
The Allmusic review by Scott Yanow awarded the album 4½ stars calling it "Bobby Timmons most advanced recordings of the 1960s".

Track listing
All compositions by Bobby Timmons except as noted
 "Lela" (Johnny Lytle) - 9:05
 "Trick Hips" - 7:57
 "People" (Bob Merrill, Jule Styne) - 2:40
 "Bags' Groove" (Milt Jackson) - 9:11
 "This Is All I Ask" (Gordon Jenkins) - 8:35
Recorded at Rudy Van Gelder Studio in Englewood Cliffs, New Jersey on June 18, 1964 (track 3) and October 21, 1964 (tracks 1, 2, 4 & 5).

Personnel
Bobby Timmons - piano
Johnny Lytle (tracks 1, 2, 4 & 5) - vibes
Keter Betts (tracks 1, 2, 4 & 5), Sam Jones (track 3) - bass
William "Peppy" Hinnant (tracks 1, 2, 4 & 5), Ray Lucas (track 3) - drums

References

Prestige Records albums
Bobby Timmons albums
1964 albums
Albums produced by Ozzie Cadena
Albums recorded at Van Gelder Studio